Luciano Slagveer is a Dutch footballer who plays as a winger for Puskás Akadémia. Slagveer is of Surinamese descent.

References

External links
 
 Voetbal International profile 
 
 

1993 births
Living people
Dutch footballers
Netherlands under-21 international footballers
Netherlands youth international footballers
Dutch expatriate footballers
Association football forwards
Eredivisie players
Belgian Pro League players
SC Heerenveen players
K.S.C. Lokeren Oost-Vlaanderen players
FC Twente players
FC Emmen players
Puskás Akadémia FC players
Nemzeti Bajnokság I players
Expatriate footballers in Belgium
Expatriate footballers in Hungary
Dutch expatriate sportspeople in Hungary
Dutch sportspeople of Surinamese descent
Footballers from Rotterdam